Kalamata International Airport  "Captain Vassilis Constantakopoulos" is an airport in the city of Kalamata, Greece. It mainly receives flights during the summer. In March 2013, Aegean Airlines opened a base in the airport.

Overview
The airport is located between Kalamata and Messini on GR-82 (Pylos – Kalamata – Sparta) and west of the train tracks on the Pamisos River plain. The runway is about 2.7 km long and runs from north to south from the highway north to the plain. The terminal lies to the east and is accessed with GR-7/E55/E65 (Kalamata – Tripoli – Corinth).

There is a military base of the Hellenic Air Force and an air-training department to the west of the runway. The air base uses the same runway as civilian aircraft.

History 
Kalamata International Airport was opened in 1959. Charter flights began to operate out of the airport in 1986 and a new terminal was built in 1991. The same year Hellenic Civil Aviation took over as operator of the airport. In 2012 the airport was renamed after Vassilis C. Constantakopoulos.

Airlines and destinations
The following airlines operate regular scheduled and charter flights at Kalamata Airport:

Statistics

Accidents and incidents 
On 16 October 1971, an NAMC YS-11 turboprop regional airliner of Olympic Airways was hijacked. It had departed from Kalamata International Airport to Hellinikon International Airport. There was one hijacker, who demanded to be taken to Lebanon. All 64 passengers and crew survived after the aircraft was stormed and the hijacker arrested. The hijacking lasted less than a day.
In November 2001, fourteen plane spotters (twelve British and two Dutch) were arrested by the police after being observed photographing aircraft at the air base.

Ground Transport
The airport has been criticised for the lack of public transport. The only way to reach the airport is by car, taxi or bus. The neighboring railway line to Messini and Kalamata was shut down in 2011.

See also
Transport in Greece

References

External links 
 Kalamata International Airport (KLX)

Kalamata
Airports in Greece
Buildings and structures in Messenia
Transport infrastructure in Peloponnese (region)